Efraím Cardozo (1906–1973) was a Paraguayan politician and historian.

Childhood and studies
Born in Villarrica, Paraguay, he was a son of a teacher and bureaucrat guaireño Ramon Indalecio Cardozo and Juana Sosa. His father was involved in the educational reform of 1924. He grew up in an educational household which marked his later life as a journalist and historian. He married Hilda Clara Saguier Aceval.
 
In 1921, he joined the National College of Asuncion where in 1925 became to preside over the Student Center and ran magazine "Ariel" along with Juan Esteban Carrón. He finished high school with relevant qualifications and began his studies in advocacy in the institution from which also his mother had graduated. His doctoral thesis was on "The Chaco in the Viceroyalty of River Plate."

Within a few years, his name was known in the intellectual and journalistic fields. Amateur for historical research harvested a deep knowledge of the troubled past Paraguay. His academic activity was fruitful. He practiced professorship at the National University, Catholic University and high schools in San Jose and Teresiano.

Public activities
 In 1931 he served as secretary of the President of the Paraguay Jose Patricio Guggiari
 Secretary of the National Legación Rio de Janeiro (1933)
 During the war against Bolivia (1932–1935), he served in the operations command of General José Félix Estigarribia. He was responsible to redact diplomatic documents which defended the positions of Paraguay. 
 The president Eusebio Ayala appointed him a member of the Boundary Commission whose procedures were implemented with the signing of the protocol of June 12, 1935.

Later, he was appointed general secretary of the Paraguayan delegation at the peace conference of 1938. During the presidency of Higinio Morínigo, Cardozo went to live into exile  settled in Buenos Aires where he wrote for the newspaper "La Razon". He stayed ten years in Argentina.

During the government of Félix Paiva he was appointed Plenipotentiary Delegate to the Peace Conference which took place in Buenos Aires with the presence of American representatives. 
He joined the delegation to the College who initialed the Arbitral award bordering 1938. 
The government of President Estigarribia was part of his first cabinet, holding the portfolio of Justice, Cult and Civic Instruction, while the post of interim chancellor. 
He was Deputy National 1938.

In 1940, he was appointed Plenipotentiary Minister to the Argentine government.  Once the Liberal party was proscribed, Dr. Cardozo returned to his old job in the newspaper “La Razon. "

Throughout his life, he collected valuable historical documents and information relating to Paraguay and River Plate. In 1954, he gave classes in Europe, at the Institute for Hispanic Culture invited by the Latin-American’s Graduate School.

Publications
His desires of communicator began with the awakening of his intelligence. In 1917, when he was ten years old and together with other classmates, he published "The guaireño", according to the people of the time, it had the characteristics of adult press.  He was editor and editor of the newspaper "El liberal". He collaborated by writing articles on "La Razon" Buenos Aires, "Radical", "ABC" and "Comunidad" of Asuncion.

Since 1923 until the beginning of the war with Bolivia, he published several works related to the defense of the legal rights of Paraguay in the conflict which threatened with the loss of Chaco Boreal. “El Chaco en el Régimen de las Intendencias. La creación de Bolivia”, “El Chaco y los Virreyes. La cuestión paraguayo-boliviana según documentos de los archivos de Buenos Aires y de Río de Janeiro”, “La Audiencia de Charcas y la Facultad de gobierno” “Apuntes de historia cultural del Paraguay”, are works which bear witness to the wealth and the seriousness of his arguments that took him to continental notoriety.

Half of the hundred of his writings are a valuable source of knowledge for novices and experts. His collection of 13 volumes of "A hundred years ago," compilation of articles the newspaper "La Tribuna", published throughout the centennial of the epic of the 1870s, remains as testimony to undeniable great value. "The Paraguay of the Conquest," "The Colonial Paraguay”,  “The roots of nationality” and “The Independent Paraguay "are eternal works which acquire greater value throughout time. In 1961, the newspaper" La Prensa "Buenos Aires conferred him the prize Alberdi - Sarmiento.

Death and historical legacy
His name appears among the most enlightened historians of Paraguay. Member of a hundred institutions and academies across the continent and Spain, he studied the social and historical memory of the American nations, his views being important in the formation of intellectual generations of young students and researchers.

He died while a senator of Paraguay, on 10 April 1973.

Notes

References

External links
 Villarik.com  Villarrik
 Biography of Efraím Cardozo  Biografías

1906 births
1973 deaths
People from Villarrica, Paraguay
Liberal Party (Paraguay) politicians
Paraguayan historians
20th-century historians